Richard Bracken may refer to:
 Richard M. Bracken (born  1952), chairman and chief executive officer of the Hospital Corporation of America
 Richard Bracken (film editor) (1930–2021), American film editor